Senegalia ochracea is a species of plant in the family Fabaceae. It is found only in Somalia. It is threatened by habitat loss.

References

ochracea
Near threatened plants
Endemic flora of Somalia
Taxonomy articles created by Polbot